Monard's African climbing mouse (Dendromus leucostomus) is a species of rodent in the family Nesomyidae. It is endemic to east-central Angola, but only recorded in the type locality of Caluquembe. The IUCN red list of threatened species lists this as a synonym for the gray climbing mouse.

References

Dendromus
Rodents of Africa
Mammals of Angola
Endemic fauna of Angola
Mammals described in 1933
Taxa named by Albert Monard